APRA Awards may refer to one of two awards ceremonies:

APRA Awards (Australia)
APRA Awards (New Zealand)